Croatian Tales of Long Ago ( lit. "Stories from Ancient Times"), is a short story collection written by the acclaimed children's author Ivana Brlić-Mažuranić (sometimes spelled as "Ivana Berlić-Mažuranić" in English), originally published in 1916 in Zagreb by the Matica hrvatska publishing house. The collection is considered her masterpiece and it features a series of newly written fairy tales heavily inspired by motifs taken from ancient Slavic mythology of pre-Christian Croatia.

Croatian Tales of Long Ago are seen as one of the most typical examples of her writing style which has been compared by literary critics to Hans Christian Andersen and J. R. R. Tolkien due to the way it combines original fantasy plots with folk mythology.

The collection was translated into English by F.S. Copeland and first published in New York in 1922 by the Frederick A. Stokes Co. and in 1924 in London by the George Allen & Unwin publishing house, the same company which originally published J.R.R. Tolkien's The Hobbit in 1937, and The Lord of the Rings trilogy in 1954–55. The English-language editions also featured illustrations by the Croatian illustrator Vladimir Kirin.

Overview
The original Croatian edition published in 1916 consisted of six stories. Two additional stories were later added and first published in the Croatian 1926 edition. These eight appear in contemporary Croatian editions. Since the English translation was published before the extra two stories were written, they featured only the original six tales. The following is the list of original titles followed by English titles as translated by Copeland (stories missing from the English version are marked with the † symbol):
Kako je Potjeh tražio istinu (How Quest Sought the Truth)
Ribar Palunko i njegova žena (Fisherman Plunk and His Wife)
Regoč (Reygoch)
Šuma Striborova (Stribor's Forest)
Bratac Jaglenac i sestrica Rutvica (Little Brother Primrose and Sister Lavender)
Lutonjica Toporko i devet župančića †
Sunce djever i Neva Nevičica (Bridesman Sun and Bride Bridekins)
Jagor †

Between 2002 and 2006, the eight stories from the collection were adapted into a series of flash animated cartoons and interactive games made by an international team of animators from eight countries, led by Helena Bulaja. The project won numerous awards at various new media and animation festivals. The cartoons were produced in Croatian, English and German and published in CD-ROM format, and are available for viewing online.

List of translations

References

Further reading
 Babić, Vanda; Vekić, Denis. "Simboličke i značenjske funkcije flore u Pričama iz davnine Ivane Brlić-Mažuranić" [Symbolic and Meaning functions of flora in Tales of Long Ago by Ivana Brlić-Mažuranić]. In: Nova prisutnost XVI, br. 2 (2018): 261–276. https://doi.org/10.31192/np.16.2.4
 Banov, Estela. "Nodilova mitološka razmatranja kao arhitekst Pričama iz davnine Ivane Brlić–Mažuranić" [The mythological in the work of Vladimir Nazor and Ivana Brlić-Mažuranić (Slavic Legends and Tales of Long Ago)]. Stoljeće Priča iz davnine Ivane Brlić-Mažuranić. Kos-Lajtman, Andrijana; Kujundžić, Nada; Lovrić Kralj, Sanja (ur.). Zagreb: Hrvatske udruge istraživača dječje književnosti, 2018. pp. 113–130.
 Engler, Tihomir, and Kos-Lajtman, Andrijana. “Bajkopisna Diseminacija mitoloških Motiva U Pričama Iz davnine Ivane Brlić-Mažuranić Na Primjeru Intertekstualnih Poveznica S Leksikonom A. Tkanyja" [Fairytalemanship-Like Dissemination of Mythological Motives in Croatian Tales of Long Ago by Ivana Brlić-Mažuranić, Exemplified by Intertextual Connections With A. Tkany's Lexicon]. In: Studia Mythologica Slavica 14 (October). 2011. Ljubljana, Slovenija. 307–326. https://doi.org/10.3986/sms.v14i0.1616.
 Kos-Lajtman, Andrijana; Horvat, Jasna. "Utjecaj ruskih mitoloških i usmenoknjiževnih elemenata na diskurs Priča iz davnine Ivane Brlić-Mažuranić" [Influence of Russian mythological and oral literary elements on the discourse of Priče iz davnine by Ivana Brlić-Mažuranić]. In: Zbornik radova Petoga hrvatskog slavističkog kongresa. 2012. pp. 157–166.
 Kos-Lajtman, Andrijana; Turza-Bogdan, Tamara. "UTJECAJ USMENOKNJIŽEVNOG I MITOLOŠKOG SUPSTRATA VARAŽDINSKOGA KRAJA NA KNJIŽEVNI RAD IVANE BRLIĆ-MAŽURANIĆ" [THE INFLUENCE OF ORAL LITERATURE AND THE MYTHOLOGICAL SUBSTRATUM OF THE VARAŽDIN REGION ON THE LITERARY WORK OF IVANA BRLIĆ-MAŽURANIĆ]. In: Narodna umjetnost 47, br. 2 (2010): 175–190. https://hrcak.srce.hr/61990
 Peroš, Zrinka; Ivon, Katarina; & Bacalja, Robert. (2007). "More u pričama Ivane Brlić-Mažuranić" [SEA IN TALES OF IVANA BRLIĆ-MAŽURANIĆ]. In: Magistra Iadertina. 2 (2). 2007. pp. 61–78. DOI: 10.15291/magistra.880.
 Utasi, Anikó. "Jezična šetnja u šumi Striborovoj Prijevod Priča iz davnine Ivane Brlić-Mažuranić na mađarski jezik" [A linguistic walk in Stribor's forest: A translation of Tales of Long Ago into Hungarian]. In: Libri et liberi 6, br. 2 (2018): 213–231. https://doi.org/10.21066/carcl.libri.2017-06(02).0003
Vasiljeva, Ljudmila. "Ukrajinski prijevodi Priča iz davnine: leksičke i frazeološke osobitosti" [Ukrainian translations of Tales of Long Ago and their lexical and phraseological characteristics]. In: Libri et liberi 6, br. 2 (2018): 233–244. https://doi.org/10.21066/carcl.libri.2017-06(02).0004
 Verdonik, Maja. "PRIČE IZ DAVNINE IVANE BRLIĆ-MAŽURANIĆ NA POZORNICI GRADSKOG KAZALIŠTA LUTAKA RIJEKA" [TALES FROM LONG AGO BY IVANA BRLIĆ-MAŽURANIĆ ON THE CITY PUPPET THEATRE RIJEKA STAGE]. In: FLUMINENSIA 21, br. 1 (2009): 145–162. https://hrcak.srce.hr/43479
 Zima, Dubravka. "Bajke Ivane Brlić-Mažuranić izvan "Priča iz davnine" [The Fairy Tales of Ivana Brlić-Mažuranić and Children's Literature]. In: Kroatologija 2, br. 1 (2011): 217–229. https://hrcak.srce.hr/75503
 Libri et Liberi: Časopis za istraživanje dječje književnosti i kulture [Journal of Research on Children's Literature and Culture] Vol. 5 No. 2. Zagreb: Hrvatska udruga istraživača dječje književnosti [Croatian Association of Researchers in Children's Literature]. 2016. pp. 323–438. . DOI: 10.21066/carcl.libri

External links

Complete 1922 New York edition in PDF format from the Internet Archive
Scans of the 1924 English edition at the Yale University Library website
List of works by Ivana Brlić-Mažuranić including a comprehensive list of foreign translations 
Croatian Tales of Long Ago animated series online

1916 short story collections
Croatian fantasy
Children's short story collections
Collections of fairy tales
Croatian short stories
1916 children's books